La Araucanía International Airport , also known as Temuco Airport, is the main airport in the Araucanía Region and southern Chile.

It has a parking apron with capacity for 4 aircraft (up to Boeing 767 type), a  passenger terminal, and 3 boarding bridges.

Commissioning 
Through a NOTAM issued on July 18, 2014, the Directorate General of Civil Aviation (DGAC) authorized the start of operations of the new airport on Tuesday July 29, 2014 which was completed with the first landing of a commercial aircraft Sky Airline Airbus A320.

Airlines and destinations

See also
Transport in Chile
List of airports in Chile

References

External links
La Araucanía Airport at OpenStreetMap
La Araucanía Airport at OurAirports

Airports in La Araucanía Region